The canton of Essômes-sur-Marne is an administrative division of the Aisne department, in northern France. It was created at the French canton reorganisation which came into effect in March 2015. Its seat is in Essômes-sur-Marne.

It consists of the following communes: 
 
Azy-sur-Marne
Barzy-sur-Marne
Bézu-le-Guéry
Bonneil
Celles-lès-Condé
La Chapelle-sur-Chézy
Charly-sur-Marne
Chartèves
Chézy-sur-Marne
Condé-en-Brie
Connigis
Coupru
Courboin
Courtemont-Varennes
Crézancy
Crouttes-sur-Marne
Dhuys-et-Morin-en-Brie
Domptin
L'Épine-aux-Bois
Essises
Essômes-sur-Marne
Jaulgonne
Lucy-le-Bocage
Marigny-en-Orxois
Mézy-Moulins 
Montfaucon
Monthurel
Montigny-lès-Condé
Montlevon
Montreuil-aux-Lions
Nogentel
Nogent-l'Artaud
Pargny-la-Dhuys
Passy-sur-Marne
Pavant
Reuilly-Sauvigny
Romeny-sur-Marne
Rozoy-Bellevalle
Saint-Eugène
Saulchery 
Trélou-sur-Marne
Vallées-en-Champagne
Vendières
Veuilly-la-Poterie
Viels-Maisons
Viffort
Villiers-Saint-Denis

References

Cantons of Aisne